Ahmad Basarah is an Indonesian politician and currently member of the People's Representative Council.

In the 2019 General Election, he got elected for the fourth time by the electoral district of East Java V. 
He is known as a close ally to Puan Maharani and as the deputy chairman of the People's Consultative Assembly, he is known by his ambitions to implement the Pancasila as the state ideology of Indonesia.

References 

Members of the People's Representative Council, 2009
Members of the People's Representative Council, 2014
Members of the People's Representative Council, 2019
1968 births
Living people